Gwen Welles (born Gwen Goldberg, March 4, 1951 – October 13, 1993) was an American actress.

Early years
Gwen Welles was born in Chattanooga, Tennessee, as Gwen Goldberg. She was the daughter of clothing designer Rebecca Welles and Barton Goldberg; her sisters were Elizabeth (Betsy) Goldberg Welles and Lori Yarom. Gwen graduated from University High School in Los Angeles, California and attended Vassar College. When she was 17, she worked as a dress salesperson.

Career 
Welles's film debut was in A Safe Place (1971). In the early 1970s, she acted in two films for Roger Vadim during three years that she spent in France. She may be best remembered for her portrayal of untalented singer Sueleen Gay in Robert Altman's 1975 film Nashville, for which she was nominated for a BAFTA Award, for Best Supporting Actress. Welles also appeared in Altman's California Split (1974), as well as several films directed by Henry Jaglom, including New Year's Day (1989) and Eating (1990).

Personal life 
Welles was an advocate of yoga, usually meditating 20-30 minutes twice a day.

During her three years in France, she lived with Roger Vadim. She told newspaper columnist Earl Wilson, "I was very naive. I was about 20. I was so in love with him. I would sulk for two hours, I would go to pieces, if he gave me a wrong look." During her time in Paris, she posed for a set of nude photographs for a magazine to earn money to remain there another year. She also was injured in an automobile accident. She married Harris Yulin in 1975.

Death 
Welles died from cancer of the bowel in 1993 at age 42. Donna Deitch directed An Angel On My Shoulder, a documentary about Welles' illness in 1992, which appeared at the IFC's Lesbian and Gay film festival in August 1998.

Filmography

References

External links
 
 

1951 births
1993 deaths
Actresses from Tennessee
American film actresses
Deaths from cancer in California
People from Chattanooga, Tennessee
20th-century American actresses